Michael Carowsky (1707- 1745)  was a Swedish church painter.

Biography
Carowsky moved from Danzig to Gothenburg, Sweden where he became master at the City of Gothenburg Art and Painters' Office  (Göteborgs Målareämbete) in 1742.
In 1744, he was married to the artist Maria Carowsky (1723-1793). The couple had one daughter, Christina Elisabeth Carowsky (1745-1797), who became a notable portrait painter in Gothenburg.

  
His master works consisted of paintings at the Gothenburg City Hall (Stora rådhussalen).
Among other works are the figural paintings at Borgvik Church  (Borgviks kyrka) from 1745 and, together with his father-in-law Johan Ross the Elder (1695–1773),  he completed church ceiling paintings at Örgryte Old Church (Örgryte gamla kyrka) from 1741.

References

Other sources
Svenskt konstnärslexikon, part one (1), page: 289, (Allhems Förlag, Malmö)

Swedish artists
1707 births
1745 deaths